Rečica is a village in the municipality of Novi Grad, Bosnia and Herzegovina.

Demographics 
According to the 2013 census, its population was 332.

References

Populated places in Novi Grad, Sarajevo